Daniel James Callum Blue (born 19 August 1977), known professionally as Callum Blue, is an English actor. Best known for his roles on the Showtime series Dead Like Me and The Tudors, as well as his roles as Zod in the American television series Smallville, Alex in the British television series The Secret Diary of a Call Girl alongside Billie Piper, and Andrew Jacoby in the film The Princess Diaries 2: Royal Engagement alongside Anne Hathaway.

Filmography

References

External links

 

1977 births
20th-century English male actors
21st-century English male actors
Alumni of the Mountview Academy of Theatre Arts
English male film actors
English male television actors
Living people
Male actors from London